At Night, Alone. is the second studio album by American singer Mike Posner. It was released on May 6, 2016 by Island. The album features guest appearances by Labrinth and Big Sean.

The album received positive reviews from music critics, who celebrated the record's mature sound, and his autobiographic and introspective lyrical content. The album was considered a qualitative big step forward from his previous album 31 Minutes to Takeoff.

Background
Mike Posner released his first single in two years, "The Way It Used to Be" in June 2013, and announced the release of his second album Pages. In October 2013, Posner said in an interview with Billboard: "I've made maybe over 100 songs since the last album, so I've got a good 12, 15 I'm proud of." A second single featuring Big Sean, "Top of the World" was released in December 2013. In March 2014, Billboard reported that Pages would be released later that year, but the release never materialized. Instead, Posner released the extended play, The Truth in June 2015 on Island Records, featuring four tracks later featured on At Night, Alone.

"I Took a Pill in Ibiza" was released as a single on July 24, 2015, and found international success in a remix by Seeb. In August 2015, Posner said that he had recorded two albums (Pages and Sky High) since his debut album, 31 Minutes to Takeoff (2010), which were both shelved by his former label RCA Records because "they didn't have a hit".

Posner said country singer Jake Owen encouraged him to "tell the truth" in his songs" and showed him artists like Willie Nelson and Merle Haggard, which made Posner realize that "you can just literally say the truth and it’s beautiful, and it’s heart-wrenching and it’s funny". The album is inspired by country music according to Posner: "So, like, the way I was inspired by hip-hop when I first started and would sort of sing hip-hop, this new (music) is kind of my take on country music. It doesn't sound country and no one uses the word country to describe it, but it's me trying to do country and it comes out weird and different."

Singles
"I Took a Pill in Ibiza" was first released on Mike Posner's extended play, The Truth, on June 22, 2015. The remix version by Seeb was released on July 24, 2015.

Promotional singles
"Be as You Are" was released as promotional single in the United States on July 26, 2016. On February 17, 2017 a remix of "In the Arms of a Stranger" by Grey was released as promotional single.

Reception

David Jeffries of AllMusic noted an improvement for Posner in the album, writing, "This might not yet be the ultimate showcase for his talents, but At Night, Alone is both a welcome return and a significant step forward." Jordan Simon of Idolator wrote, "Posner on the album places his bets as pop's 'born-again' countryman," calling the album "not a pop jamboree. It is truth in advertising, an album exclusively optimized for solitude spent immersed in deep thought." Gwilym Mumford of The Guardian wrote, "Some curios apart—the a cappella revolutionary hymn 'Only God Knows' and rowdy folk-punk of 'Jade'—there is little here that lingers long in the memory, with only Posner's braggadocio and pinched vocals distinguishing him from the singer-songwriter crowd."

Track listing

Notes
  signifies an additional producer
  signifies a remixer

Personnel
Adapted from the liner notes:

I Took a Pill in Ibiza
 Mike Posner – lead and background vocals
 Eugene Huang – guitar
 Nikolaj Torp – piano, Wurlitzer electric piano, whistle
 Martin Terefe – bass and background vocals
 Geoff Lea – drums
 Oskar Winberg – additional percussion
 Recorded by Sam Keyte at Kensaltown Recording Studios
 Vocals recorded by Mike Posner at Mike's House
 Mixed by Tony Maserati and Tyler Scott at Mirrorball Studios

Not That Simple
 Mike Posner – lead and background vocals, piano and space echo
 Glen Scott – piano and organ
 Adam Friedman – guitar
 Martin Terefe – bass
 Kristoffer Sonne – drums and percussion
 Forrest D. Gray – string arrangement
 Recorded by Sam Keyte at Kensaltown Recording Studios, assisted by Kristian Larsen
 Vocals recorded by Mike Posner at Mike's House
 Additional recording by Oskar Winberg
 Mixed by Tony Maserati and Tyler Scott at Mirrorball Studios

Be as You Are
 Mike Posner – lead and background vocals
 Adam Friedman – keyboards, guitar, drums and percussion, background vocals
 Simon Huber – bass
 Alex Toff – drums
 Oskar Winberg – percussion
 Ro Rowan – cello
 Vocals recorded by Mike Posner at Mike's House
 Mixed by Tony Maserati and Tyler Scott at Mirrorball Studios

In the Arms of a Stranger
 Mike Posner – lead and background vocals, keyboards, space echo
 Glen Scott – keyboards
 Adam Friedman – guitar
 Martin Terefe – bass
 Kristoffer Sonne – drums
 Recorded by Sam Keyte at Kensaltown Recording Studios, assisted by Kristian Larsen
 Vocals recorded by Mike Posner at Mike's House
 Additional recording by Oskar Winberg
 Mixed by Tony Maserati and Tyler Scott at Mirrorball Studios

Silence
 Mike Posner – lead and background vocals, keyboards, piano and space echo
 Glen Scott – keyboards
 Adam Friedman – guitar
 Martin Terefe – bass
 Kristoffer Sonne – drums
 Recorded by Sam Keyte at Kensaltown Recording Studios, assisted by Kristian Larsen
 Vocals recorded by Mike Posner at Mike's House
 Additional recording by Oskar Winberg
 Mixed by Tony Maserati and Tyler Scott at Mirrorball Studios

Iris
 Mike Posner – lead and background vocals
 Adam Friedman – guitar, keyboards, drums, percussion, background vocals
 Erick "Jesus" Coomes – bass
 MdL – drums and percussion
 Recorded by Adam Friedman, MdL and Mike Posner at Mike's House
 Mixed by Tony Maserati and Tyler Scott at Mirrorball Studios

Only God Knows
 Mike Posner – lead and background vocals
 Norman Henry Mamey – "words of wisdom"
 Recorded by Mike Posner at Mike's House
 Mixed by Tony Maserati and Tyler Scott at Mirrorball Studios

Jade
 Mike Posner – lead and background vocals
 Ely "The Creep" Rise – keyboards, organ
 Nick Maybury – guitar
 Bana Haffar – bass
 MdL – drums and percussion, programming
 Recorded by Mike Posner and Mason Levy at Mike's House
 Mixed by Tony Maserati and Tyler Scott at Mirrorball Studios

One Hell of a Song
 Mike Posner – lead and background vocals
 James Valentine – guitar
 Erick "Jesus" Coomes – bass
 Adam Friedman – drums, percussion, background vocals
 MdL – drums
 Recorded by Mike Posner and Adam Friedman at Mike's House
 Mixed by Tony Maserati and Tyler Scott at Mirrorball Studios

Buried in Detroit
 Mike Posner – lead and background vocals, piano
 Glenn Scott – Rhodes piano
 Martin Terefe – bass
 Kristoffer Sonne – drums and percussion
 Steven Pemberton – drums
 Oskar Winberg, John Magnussen – additional percussion 
 Norman Henry Mamey – orchestral arrangement and conductor
 Bob O'Donnell – orchestra contractor
 Michael Markman, Neil Sample, Leslie Katz, Rebecca Chung, Lisa Dondlinger, Lorand Lokuszta, Lorenz Gamma, Tamaa Chernyak-Pepp, Marisa Sorajja, Radu Pieptka – violins
 Nancy Roth, Pamela Goldsmith – violas
 Dennis Karamazyn, Paul Hochhalter – cellos
 Kevin Axt – brass
 Brian Scanlon, Jeff Driskhill, Phillip Feather, John Carr – woodwinds
 Gary Halopoff, Chris Tedesco – trumpets
 Charles Morillas, David Ryan, Craig Ware – trombones
 Amy Wilkins – harp
 Recorded by Sam Keyte at Kensaltown Recording Studios, assisted by Kristian Larsen
 Orchestra recorded by Dennis Sands at EastWest Studios
 Piano and additional vocals recorded by Josh Connolly, Dominic Jordan, Jimmy Giannos at the Hideout Recording Studio
 Additional recording by Oskar Winberg
 Mixed by Tony Maserati and Tyler Scott at Mirrorball Studios

Charts

Weekly charts

Year-end charts

Certifications

References

2016 albums
Albums produced by Mike Posner
Albums produced by Labrinth
Mike Posner albums